Serpovo is a rural locality (a village) in Kemskoye Rural Settlement, Nikolsky District, Vologda Oblast, Russia. The population was 19 as of 2002.

Geography 
Serpovo is located 54 km west of Nikolsk (the district's administrative centre) by road. Demino is the nearest rural locality.

References 

Rural localities in Nikolsky District, Vologda Oblast